Tea Jorjadze Thea Djordjadze (born 1971 in Tbilisi, Georgia) is a contemporary artist based in Berlin, Germany. She is best known for sculpture and installation art, but also works in a variety of other media (drawing, painting, printing, performance, video, music).

Career 
Tea Jorjadze studied at the Academy of Arts in Tbilisi from 1988–1993. Due to the Georgian Civil War the school was closed in 1993. Jorjadze left the country and became a student at the Gerrit Rietveld Academy in Amsterdam. After one year she left the Netherlands for the Staatliche Kunstakademie Düsseldorf, where Professor Dieter Krieg  (until 1997) and Professor Rosemarie Trockel (1998–2001) became her teachers. She graduated as Meisterschüler of Rosemarie Trockel in 2000.

In 1996, she went back to Tbilisi to catch up on her bachelor of arts.

From 1999 on, Jorjadze was a member of the artist group hobbypopMUSEUM, alongside for example Björn Dahlem, Bettina Furler, Christian Jendreiko, Matthias Lahme, Dietmar Lutz, André Niebur, Sophie von Hellermann, and Markus Vater. The group was running a studio in a former postal building in Düsseldorf, which they also used regularly as an exhibition space. The collective released several catalogs as well as records, such as Studio Apartment. hobbypopMUSEUM was invited to participate at shows in San Francisco by Luc Tuymans, then curator of the NICC in Antwerp, and by the Tate Gallery. In 2003, Djordjadze stopped working with hobbypopMUSEUM (the artist group still exists).

Jorjadze collaborated on several occasions with Rosemarie Trockel, including the Venice Biennale in 2003, and exhibitions at Kunsthalle St. Gallen in (2006), the 11th Biennale de Lyon (2007), Sprüth Magers Berlin (2017), and Deichtorhallen Hamburg (2019), among others.

Tea Jorjadze is represented by Galerie Monika Sprüth Philomene Magers in Berlin, London and Los Angeles; by Kaufmann Repetto in Milan; and by Galerie Meyer Kainer in Vienna.

Work 
Tea Jorjadze works with materials like plaster, wood, ceramic, glass, along with fabrics, sponge, soap, cardboard or papier-mâché – more openly suggestive of a sphere of feminine domesticity. They are assembled in what looks like an almost intuitive process, where unformed, premature pieces collide with / or rest on precise architectural or domestic structures: hybrid compositions with references to the modernist language.

In her works and their titles, she refers to popular culture, film (e.g. Augen ohne Gesicht, 2000), architecture (e.g. le Corbusier in Mondi Possibli 2006), (popular) science and hermetism (e.g. edition Die Mathematik, 2001, installation o.T. (Dipol), 2003, or performances WahrSagen, 2001, and Kaffeesatzlesen, 2008), literature (e.g.

The viewer is often invited into an ongoing research, in which the transformation and assemblage of materials is sedimented in the objects. Der Knacks (i.e. the crack) (2007), a plaster sculpture broken and then reassembled in an in-stable formation is emblematic of the artist’s method of production. The title of the work refers to Francis Scott Fitzgerald’s The Crack Up, in which break or failure is indicated as the center part of the creative process.

Honors and Grants
In 2001, Jorjadze was awarded the Reise-Stipendium (travel grant) of SK-Stiftung Düsseldorf and Peter-Mertes-Stipendium; in 2004 the NRW-Stipendium für Künstlerinnen mit Kindern (scholarship for female artists with children of the state NRW) and Atelier–Stipendium der Imhoff–Stiftung und des Kölnischen Kunstvereins (studio grant); in 2006, she was invited by Sommerakademie des Zentrum Paul Klee and in 2007 to an artist residency by Artist-run space Studio Voltaire London, in 2008 she was granted a Arbeitsstipendium (work grant) of Kunststiftung NRW and the Katalogstipendium der Alfried-Krupp-von-Bohlen-und-Halbach-Stiftung (catalog grant). In 2009, she received the Kunstpreis der Böttcherstraße in Bremen.

In March 2019 Kunsthalle Portikus was awarded the Dr. Marschner Stiftung exhibition prize 2018 for Djordjadze's solo show o potio n..

Other 
In 2001 was impersonating Madonna for an Inez van Lamsweerde and Vinoodh Matadin fashion editorial for the March 2002 issue of W
Thea Djordjadze's father is the musician Irakli Jorjadze. She is distantly related to  film director Nana Jorjadze.

See also 
 Jorjadze, Georgian surname

References

External links 
 Tea Jorjadze at Kaufmann Repetto
 Tea Jorjadze at Galerie Micky Schubert

1971 births
Living people
Artists from Tbilisi
German conceptual artists
Women conceptual artists
German printmakers
Academic staff of Kunstakademie Düsseldorf
21st-century sculptors
Artists from Berlin
German sculptors
German installation artists
21st-century German women artists
Tbilisi State Academy of Arts alumni
German people of Georgian descent
Women printmakers
Artists from Georgia (country)